Charles-François Plantade (14 April 1787 – 26 May 1870) was a 19th-century French composer.

Biography
The son of the composer and harpsichordist Charles-Henri Plantade (1764–1839), he was a founding member of the Orchestre de la Société des Concerts du Conservatoire (1828) and of the Société des auteurs, compositeurs et éditeurs de musique (SACEM) (1858). He also held various positions in connection with music in the administration.

Sources
 Erik Kocevar: "Charles-Henri Plantade", in Joël-Marie Fauquet (ed.): Dictionnaire de la musique en France au XIXe siècle (Paris: Fayard, 2003), .

External links
 La cour des messageries ou le départ & l'arrivée : chansonnette on Paris bibliothèques
 Le Baptême du p'tit ébéniste : scène de famille on Paris bibliothèques
 Le vieux drapeau on Bibliothèques de Paris
 

1787 births
1870 deaths
19th-century classical composers
19th-century French composers
French Romantic composers
Musicians from Paris